Suvo is a rural locality (a selo) in Barguzinsky District, Republic of Buryatia, Russia. The population was 382 as of 2010. There are seven streets.

Geography 
Suvo is located 45 km east of Barguzin (the district's administrative centre) by road. Bodon is the nearest rural locality.

References 

Rural localities in Barguzinsky District